Galaxy Quest is a 1999 American science-fiction comedy film directed by Dean Parisot and written by David Howard and Robert Gordon. A parody of and homage to science-fiction films and series, especially Star Trek and its fandom, the film depicts the cast of a fictional cult television series, Galaxy Quest, who are drawn into a real interstellar conflict by actual aliens who think the series is an accurate documentary. It stars Tim Allen, Sigourney Weaver, Alan Rickman, Tony Shalhoub, Sam Rockwell, and Daryl Mitchell. The film was a modest box office success and positively received by critics: It won the Hugo Award for Best Dramatic Presentation and the Nebula Award for Best Script. It was also nominated for 10 Saturn Awards, including Best Science Fiction Film and Best Director for Parisot, Best Actress for Weaver, and Best Supporting Actor for Rickman, with Allen winning Best Actor.

Galaxy Quest eventually achieved cult status, especially from Star Trek fans for its affectionate parody, but also from more mainstream audiences as a comedy film in its own right.

Several Star Trek cast and crew members praised the film. It was included in Reader's Digests list of the Top 100+ Funniest Movies of All Time in 2012, and Star Trek fans voted it the seventh best Star Trek film of all time in 2013.

Plot 
The cast of an old 1980s space-adventure television series, Galaxy Quest, spend most of their days attending fan conventions and making promotional appearances. Though the series' conceited former star, Jason Nesmith, thrives on the attention, the other cast members—Gwen, Alexander, Fred, and Tommy—resent him and, to varying degrees, the states of their careers.

At a convention, Jason is approached by a group calling themselves Thermians, led by Mathesar, who request his help. Jason thinks they want him for a promotional appearance and agrees. The next morning, when the Thermians pick him up, Jason is hung over and does not grasp that the Thermians are aliens and that he has been transported to a working re-creation of the bridge of the NSEA Protector, the starship from Galaxy Quest. Believing he is on a set and must perform in character, he confronts the Thermians' enemy, the evil warlord Sarris, who demands the "Omega 13", a secret superweapon mentioned in the final scene of the series, which has never been used and whose capabilities are unknown. Giving perfunctory orders, Jason manages to temporarily defeat Sarris.

After the grateful Thermians transport him back to Earth, Jason realizes the experience was real. He attempts to convince the other cast members, but is rebuffed. When the Thermian Laliari appears and requests Jason's help again, the cast, thinking it is a job, join him, including their handler Guy, who played an ill-fated redshirt in one episode of the series. Aboard the Protector, the cast learns that the Thermians, who possess no concept of fiction, believe episodes of Galaxy Quest are true "historical documents". Inspired by the crew's adventures, they have based their society on the virtues espoused by the show and manufactured a functioning replica of the Protector.

Sarris returns and attacks the Protector again, and the ship barely escapes through a magnetic minefield; however, the ship's power source, a beryllium sphere, is severely damaged. The humans travel to the surface of a nearby planet for a new sphere, which they snatch from ferocious, childlike aliens. When the humans return to the Protector, they discover that Sarris has seized the ship and demands the "Omega 13" device. Jason confesses that he is not an actual commander and shows Sarris the Galaxy Quest "historical documents". Sarris understands they are just actors and forces Jason to explain to a disillusioned Mathesar that acting and fiction are a form of lies and deception, concepts foreign to Thermians.

Sarris activates the Protector'''s self-destruct mechanism and returns to his ship, leaving the Thermians and the cast members to die. The humans formulate a plan to abort the self-destruct and defeat Sarris' remaining troops on the ship. Jason communicates with Brandon, a Galaxy Quest superfan on Earth, and his network of friends with intimate knowledge of the show. They talk Jason and Gwen through the ship's core and help them abort the self-destruct sequence. Meanwhile, Alexander leads the Thermians against Sarris' forces and they take back control of the Protector. With renewed confidence, the crew challenges Sarris and draws his ship into the magnetic minefield. This time, the Protector drags the magnetic mines into Sarris' vessel, destroying it.

The Protector approaches Earth to bring the humans home, but Sarris, who escaped his ship's destruction, ambushes them on the bridge and fatally wounds several crew members. Jason manages to activate the "Omega 13", which creates a 13-second time warp to the past, giving Jason and Mathesar a chance to disarm Sarris before he repeats his attack.

The Protector's bridge separates from the main vessel to land the humans on Earth, while the main section of the ship carries Mathesar and the remaining Thermians into interstellar space. Guided by Brandon and his friends acting as beacons, the Protector bridge crashes into a Galaxy Quest convention, coming to a stop on the main stage. The dazed cast emerges to the cheers of their fans, but Sarris reemerges to imperil them again. Jason shoots and destroys Sarris, and the ecstatic crowd assumes it was all a massive display of special effects. The cast basks in the adoration of Brandon, his pals, and their fans.

Some time later, Galaxy Quest is revived as a sequel series, Galaxy Quest: The Journey Continues, with the cast reprising their roles alongside Guy and Laliari as new cast members.

 Cast 

 Tim Allen as Jason Nesmith, who played Commander Peter Quincy Taggart, the commander of the NSEA Protector and main character of the series.
 Sigourney Weaver as Gwen DeMarco, who played Lieutenant Tawny Madison, the ship's communications officer and the only officer aboard who can give orders to the ship's computer.
 Alan Rickman as Alexander Dane, who played Dr. Lazarus, the ship's science officer and a member of the Mak'tar, an alien species known for their super intelligence and psionic powers.
 Tony Shalhoub as Fred Kwan, who played Tech Sergeant Chen, the ship's chief engineer.
 Sam Rockwell as Guy Fleegman, the cast's handler at conventions, who also played a "redshirt" (a short-lived minor character) in a single episode, simply referred to as "Crewman #6". In the revival at the end of the film, he gains a part as Security Chief "Roc" Ingersol.
 Daryl Mitchell as Tommy Webber, who played Lieutenant Laredo, a precocious child pilot.
 Corbin Bleu portrays a younger Laredo during the "original" TV series
 Enrico Colantoni as Mathesar, the leader of the Thermians.
 Robin Sachs as Roth'h'ar Sarris, the General leading the reptilian humanoids who seek to destroy the Thermians
 Patrick Breen as Quellek, a Thermian who forms a bond with Alexander Dane.
 Missi Pyle as Laliari, a Thermian and love interest for Fred. In the revival at the end of the film, she goes under the name of Jane Doe, playing a character called "Laliari".
 Jed Rees as Teb, a Thermian and Mathesar's second-in-command.
 Justin Long as Brandon, a dedicated fan of Galaxy Quest (Long's film debut)
 Jeremy Howard as Kyle, Brandon's friend.
 Kaitlin Cullum as Katelyn, Brandon's friend
 Jonathan Feyer as Hollister, Brandon's friend
 Heidi Swedberg as Brandon's mom
 Wayne Péré as Lathe, Sarris's second-in-command.
 Samuel Lloyd as Neru, a Thermian.
 Rainn Wilson as Lahnk, a Thermian (Wilson's film debut)
 Joe Frank as the voice of the Protector computer

 Production 
 Development 
The original spec script by David Howard was titled Captain Starshine. Howard stated he got the idea while at an IMAX presentation, where one of the trailers for an upcoming "Americans in Space" film was narrated by Leonard Nimoy, a leading actor from Star Trek. The trailer got Howard thinking about how the other Star Trek actors had become pigeonholed in these roles since the cancellation of Star Trek, and he then came up with the idea of what if there were real aliens involved. From there, he considered that the rest of his script, "in a lot of ways, just wrote itself, because it just seemed so self-evident once the idea was there".

Producer Mark Johnson, who had a first-look deal with DreamWorks, did not like Howard's script but was still fascinated with its concept of space aliens who misconstrue old episodes of a television series as reality. Johnson purchased the script and had Bob Gordon use the concept to create Galaxy Quest. A fan of Star Trek, Gordon was hesitant, believing Galaxy Quest "could be a great idea or it could be a terrible idea" and initially turned it down. Gordon, who did not read Captain Starshine until after the film was completed, started from the premise of washed-up actors from a sci-fi series involved with real extraterrestrials. Gordon's initial drafts added elements of humor to Howard's script, such as the Protector scraping the walls of the space dock when Laredo pilots the real ship for the first time. Gordon became more confident in his script when he completed the scene where Nesmith confesses to the Thermians, which he felt he nailed. He submitted his first draft to DreamWorks in 1998, and it was immediately green-lit.

Mark Johnson wanted Dean Parisot to direct; Parisot had directed another film Johnson produced, Home Fries. However, DreamWorks favored Harold Ramis because of his prior experience and hired him in November 1998. Ramis wanted Alec Baldwin for the lead role, but Baldwin turned it down. Steve Martin and Kevin Kline were also considered, but Kline turned it down for family reasons. Ramis did not agree with the casting of Tim Allen as Jason Nesmith and left the project in February 1999. Parisot took over as director within three weeks. Allen said that the version of the film pitched to him by Ramis and Katzenberg felt more like Spaceballs, and that they wanted an action star to do comedy rather than a comedian to do an action film. Sigourney Weaver, who had previously worked with Ramis on Ghostbusters, said that he also wanted actors who had not appeared in science-fiction roles before, a choice she thought odd since veterans of the genre would know what was humorous. After seeing the film, Ramis said he was ultimately impressed with Allen's performance. Johnson named the main villain after film critic Andrew Sarris, while admitting he also considered 'Haskell' after Sarris's wife Molly Haskell. Once Sarris discovered, he mocked "This guy wants to insult me? Oh, boohoo. As long as they spelled my name right, I’m okay."

 Casting 
Following Parisot's assignment as director, Allen was quickly cast as Nesmith, and had to choose between Galaxy Quest and Bicentennial Man. The Bicentennial Man role went to Robin Williams. Allen said he was a big sci-fi fan and had hoped the role would launch a second part of his career as a sci-fi actor. Some of Allen's sci-fi knowledge was put to use during production: for example, when the crew is about to land on an alien planet, Allen brought up the issue of a breathable atmosphere with Johnson and Parisot; this became dialogue for Fleegman and Kwan in the movie. About his role, Allen said he based his performance more on Yul Brynner's Ramesses II from the 1956 The Ten Commandments, and less on William Shatner as Captain James Kirk from Star Trek.

Alan Rickman was selected to be Alexander Dane, who played the alien Dr. Lazarus. Rickman had been interested in the part not so much for the sci-fi elements, but because of the humor. He said "I love comedy almost more than anything. This really is one of the funniest scripts I've read," and that "actors are probably the only professionals who send themselves up. We actually have a sense of humor about ourselves." While the original script made Dane a ceremonial knight, Rickman suggested the title would be too much for the character, and this was dropped, though he remained listed as "Sir Alex Dane" in the credits. Rickman also provided input into the prosthetic piece that Dane would use to play Lazarus, saying "it was important for it to be good enough to convince the aliens who believe we're the real thing, but also cheesy enough to imagine that it was something he applied himself". Rickman's sense of drama came into play during initial reads and script revisions. Rockwell said that Rickman "was very instrumental in making sure the script hit the dramatic notes, and everything had a strong logic and reason behind it". The scene where Dane, as Dr. Lazarus, gives a final, powerfully emotional speech to Quellek, played by Patrick Breen, utilized Rickman's sense of drama, according to Rockwell. Rickman was initially annoyed with Allen's excitement over his role, but eventually the whole cast bonded over the film. Dr. Lazarus' catchphrase, "By Grabthar's Hammer", was written as a temp line in Gordon's script; Gordon planned to replace "Grabthar" with something less comical, but the line stuck as the production crew started using it around their offices and had it printed on t-shirts.

Weaver had loved the script since her first read when Ramis was the director, stating "that great sort of Wizard of Oz story of these people feeling so incomplete in the beginning, and then during the course of this adventure, they come out almost like the heroes they pretended to be in the first place". She particularly loved the part of Madison: "to me she was what a lot of women feel like, including myself, in a Hollywood situation." In addition, she had long wanted to work with both Allen and Rickman. Once Parisot replaced Ramis, Weaver lobbied Parisot to cast her, insisting that Madison needed to be blonde and have large breasts to capture the humor of a sci-fi production. She admitted she was surprised when she actually got the role. Weaver said that this role, given some of her personal insecurities, was closer to "telling the truth about myself and science fiction" compared to her performance as Ripley in the Alien films. She wore a blonde wig (which she kept after production) and an enhanced bosom, which many of the crew said gave Weaver a totally new personality. Weaver often left the set in costume and returned to her hotel to admire herself,  saying that she "loved being a starlet".

Tony Shalhoub originally auditioned for Guy Fleegman until Sam Rockwell won the role. Shalhoub was then cast as Fred Kwan instead. Shalhoub and Parisot worked together to develop the Kwan character, loosely basing him on David Carradine, who was a non-Asian in an Asian role in the Kung Fu television series. There had been an urban legend that Carradine frequently acted in his show while under the influence of drugs. While Shalhoub could not directly portray a "stoner" in a PG-13 film, he subtly used that direction, which Rockwell described as a "failed Scientologist". Shalhoub insisted that Kwan should always be shown eating to reference the stoner stereotype.

Rockwell, who wanted to develop a more serious dramatic acting career, initially considered declining the role after he was cast. He eventually recognized that several successful dramatic actors had done comedy roles early on, and Rockwell's friend Kevin Spacey convinced him to take the part. He was the last of the main actors to be cast. Rockwell fashioned Fleegman after cowardly characters from other films, such as John Turturro's Bernie in Miller's Crossing, Bill Paxton's Private Hudson in Aliens, and Michael Keaton's "Blaze" in Night Shift. Rockwell drank a lot of coffee before certain scenes to help create the over-excitement and jitters associated with the character. Rockwell's character's name, Guy Fleegman, is a homage to Guy Vardaman, a little-known actor who worked extensively on Star Trek either as a stand-in or in bit roles. Rockwell and Shalhoub improvised some dialog to contrast Fleegman as an alarmist while Kwan was always nonchalant.

Daryl Mitchell had worked with Parisot on Home Fries, and Parisot felt he was the perfect choice to play Webber. David Alan Grier was the second choice for Webber.

Justin Long was cast as Brandon, and it was Long's first feature-film role. Long had just completed a pilot for a television show under casting director Bonnie Zane, who suggested Long to her sister Debra Zane, the casting director for Galaxy Quest. Long said he was nervous auditioning as an unknown actor at the time, competing against Kieran Culkin, Eddie Kaye Thomas, and Tom Everett Scott. Parisot had given Long a copy of Trekkies, a film about the Star Trek fandom, to help prepare for the character. Long based his character on a combination of Philip Seymour Hoffman's Scotty J. from Boogie Nights and the Comic Book Guy from The Simpsons.    Paul Rudd auditioned for a role.

One of the first "Thermians" to audition was Enrico Colantoni. Colantoni loved the script and spent time before his audition developing the behavior he thought the Thermians should have. Parisot said that at the end of Colantoni's read, the actor offered a possible voice for the Thermians. Parisot immediately loved the voice and used it to establish the nature of the Thermians for the rest of the casting process. Colantoni led how the Thermians would act, which he called "happy Jehovah's Witnesses" taking everything in with "love and acceptance". Other actors cast as Thermians included Jed Rees and Rainn Wilson (his feature-film debut). According to Debra Zane, they had "a difficult time finding an actress to play a Thermian. Ultimately, Zane was so impressed with Missi Pyle's audition that she sent the casting tape directly to Parisot, with a note stating "If this is not Laliari, I will resign from the CSA." Steven Spielberg, also impressed by Pyle, asked for Laliari's role to be expanded, which developed into the romance with Kwan. Jennifer Coolidge was the second choice for the role.

Actors cast as Thermians went to "alien school" to learn how to move and talk, since they were "basically giant calamari hiding in human shape", according to Parisot. The walk was inspired by how the marionettes were articulated in the series Fireball XL5. Other idiosyncrasies were developed by the actors during this training, and several of their lines came out of improvisations. Wilson's role as Lahnk was to have been larger in the film, but the actor was double-booked for an NBC pilot in New York City. He received a crash course on how to act like a Thermian from Colantoni, Rees, and Pyle, but still was nervous around the A-list actors leading the cast. Wilson said that a deleted scene involving Lahnk, released with the film's home media, was wisely cut given how nervous he was, flubbing his lines several times.

 Filming 
Linda DeScenna, production designer of the film, was interested in the project because it would not have the same aesthetics as other 1990s science fiction films, and "it didn't have to be real, hi-tech and vacuformed". DeScenna drew inspiration for the sets not only from Star Trek, but also from Buck Rogers, Battlestar Galactica, and Lost in Space. DeScenna had hoped to incorporate more essence of the reuse of props and set elements from these shows within the film, but the film didn't provide enough space for this. She used color theming to help distinguish the key elements of the film, with steam blue for the Thermians and the Protector, while Saris and his species were made to be a green tone that stood out against that. The design of the Thermian station was influenced by the works of artist Roger Dean, especially his cover art for the Yes live album Yessongs (1973).

The bulk of the film was shot in studios in Los Angeles. Scenes of the alien planet were filmed at Goblin Valley State Park in Utah. At the time, access to the park was partly by dirt road; fees paid by the production company were used to upgrade the entire access road to asphalt pavement. Other locations used in the film included the Stahl House as Nesmith's home and the Hollywood Palladium for the fan conventions.

According to Weaver, Allen hectored her to sign a piece of the Nostromo, the spaceship from Alien, in which she had starred; she ultimately did, writing "Stolen by Tim Allen; Love, Sigourney Weaver", which she claims upset him greatly. During the period of filming, the entire cast attended a 20th-anniversary screening of Alien. After filming wrapped, Weaver kept the wig she wore for the role.

The film's visual effects were created by Industrial Light & Magic led by Bill George. A challenge in the CGI was making distinctions between scenes that were to be from the 1980s Galaxy Quest show, which would have been done normally through practical effects, and the more realistic scenes for the contemporary actors. Various practical effects were also used, such as the "piglizard" creature that the crew transports onto the Protector.

 Post-production 
After most production was done, Johnson said that DreamWorks was confused by the film, as it was not what they had expected from the script they greenlit, but pushed on post-production as they needed a film to go up against Columbia Pictures' Stuart Little. To that end, Dreamworks required cuts to earn the movie to a more family-friendly rating. The film originally received an "R" rating, according to Galaxy Quest producer Lindsey Collins and Weaver, before being recut. Shalhoub did not remember any darker version of the film. Gordon had not planned to write a "family friendly" film, and his initial script included mature scenes, such as DeMarco attempting to seduce aliens, and the crash of the escape pod into the convention hall decapitating several attendees.

During post-production, The Rugrats Movie from Paramount Pictures came out and was a box-office success. DreamWorks at that point pushed on the production to have a competing film for a younger age group as to try to compete with Rugrats. The film was edited and cut to bring the rating to a "PG", which required cutting of some of the better and funnier scenes in the film that could have survived if a "PG-13" rating had been targeted instead according to the cast and crew. In the "chompers" scene, DeMarco's line "Well, screw that!" was dubbed over her original "Well, fuck that!" Weaver stated she purposely made her dubbed line stand out as a form of protest from her original line. Another cut scene to achieve the rating was seeing the crew's quarters on the Protector, which included Dr. Lazarus' quarters which Allen called a "proctologist's dream and nightmare". Several other scenes involving Dr. Lazarus were cut, as DreamWorks felt they were too kinky for the desired rating. Other scenes were added to provide what the studio felt was necessary continuity for the intended younger audience, such as showing the limo with Nesmith and the aliens "beaming up" from Earth.

In theaters, the first 20 minutes of the film were presented in a 1.85:1 aspect ratio, before changing to a wider 2.35:1 ratio when Nesmith looks out upon space as the Protector arrives at Thermia to maximize the effect on viewers. However, this caused some problems with projectionists at movie theaters when showing the film as they had not opened up the screen curtains far enough for the wider aspect ratio. Projectionists had to be told at later showings to prepare for this transition. David Newman composed the music score.

 Promotion 
Before the release of the movie, a promotional mockumentary video titled Galaxy Quest: 20th Anniversary, The Journey Continues, aired on E!, presenting the Galaxy Quest television series as an actual cult series, and the upcoming film as a documentary about the making of the series, presenting it in a similar way to Star Trek; it featured fake interviews of the series' cast (portrayed by the actors of the actual film), "Questerians", and critics.

While these additional materials were made, DreamWorks devoted very little advertising to the film despite its placement near the Christmas season, which the cast and crew felt hurt the potential for the film. Unlike most films where the second and ongoing weekend box office takes decline, Galaxy Quest saw rising numbers over the first several weekends, and DreamWorks' Jeffrey Katzenberg apologized directly to Parisot for failing to market the film properly. Additionally, the primary trailer used for the film used a cut of the film before all the specific effects were complete, and Johnson felt that if the trailer had used the completed versions, it would have helped draw a larger audience.

 Relation to Star Trek and other science fiction works Galaxy Quest is an acknowledged homage to Star Trek; Parisot said "Part of the mission for me was to make a great Star Trek episode." Gordon's original script was titled "Galaxy Quest: The Motion Picture" as a reference to the first feature Star Trek film, and elements such as departing the space dock and the malfunctioning transporters were further nods to the film.  The prefix of the Protectors registration number NTE-3120 ostensibly alludes to some sort of similar space federation, but in reality stands for "Not The Enterprise", according to visual effects co-supervisor Bill George. Parisot refuted claims that the rock monster that Nesmith battled was based on the rock monster that had been scripted for Star Trek V: The Final Frontier, but instead was more inspired by the Gorn that Kirk faces in the Star Trek episode "Arena".

This homage also extended to the original marketing of the movie, including a promotional website intentionally designed to look like a poorly constructed fan website, with "screen captures" and poor HTML coding.

Other aspects of the film were homages to other seminal science fiction works. The Thermians' native planet, Klaatu Nebula, is a reference to the name of the alien visitor in the classic The Day the Earth Stood Still (1951). Quellek's line "I'm shot" was directly influenced by the same line from James Brolin's character in Westworld. The blue creatures on the alien planet were based on similar creatures in Barbarella. The "chompers" scene with Nesmith and DeMarco trying to reach the self-destruct abort button was inspired by a scene from the 1997 film Event Horizon involving whirring blades. The effects for the Omega 13 activation were inspired by the ending scene from Beneath the Planet of the Apes.

 Reception 
 Box office 
The film was financially successful. It earned US$7,012,630 in its opening weekend, and its total U.S. domestic tally stands at US$71,583,916; in total it has grossed US$90,683,916 worldwide.

 Critical reception Galaxy Quest received positive reviews from critics, both as a parody of Star Trek, and as a comedy film of its own. The New York Timess Lawrence Van Gelder called it "an amiable comedy that simultaneously manages to spoof these popular futuristic space adventures and replicate the very elements that have made them so durable". Roger Ebert praised the ability of the film to spoof the "illogic of the TV show". Amy Taubin of The Village Voice offered a lukewarm review, noting that "the many eight- to 11-year-olds in the audience seemed completely enthralled". Joe Leydon of Variety said that Galaxy Quest "remains light and bright as it races along, and never turns nasty or mean-spirited as it satirizes the cliches and cults of Star Trek".

Retrospective reviews for Galaxy Quest have been positive, as the film is considered to have held up over time.  On Rotten Tomatoes, it received an approval rating of 90% based on 126 reviews and an average rating of 7.30/10. The site's critical consensus reads, "Intelligent and humorous satire with an excellent cast; no previous Trekkie knowledge needed to enjoy this one." On Metacritic, the film has a score of 70 out of 100, based on 28 critics, indicating "generally favorable reviews". Esquire Matt Miller said in 2019 "the film absolutely holds up as one of the best sci-fi satires ever made—one that challenges our obsession with massive Hollywood franchises, the nature of fandom, and some of the more problematic cliches of the genre. But it does so with a self-aware empathy that makes it an enduring and lasting entry in not only science-fiction, but American film as a whole".

Acclaimed writer-director David Mamet, in his book Bambi vs. Godzilla: On the Nature, Purpose, and Practice of the Movie Business, included Galaxy Quest in a list of four "perfect" films, along with The Godfather, A Place in the Sun and Dodsworth.

 Accolades 

 Impact and legacy 
The film proved quite popular with Star Trek fans. At the 2013 Star Trek Convention in Las Vegas, Galaxy Quest received enough support in a Star Trek Film Ranking to be included with the twelve Star Trek films that had been released at the time on the voting ballot. The fans at the convention ranked it the seventh best Star Trek film.

Harold Ramis, who was originally supposed to direct the film but left following disagreements over the casting choices, notably Allen as the lead, was ultimately impressed with Allen's performance. Tim Allen later said he and William Shatner were "now friends because of this movie".Galaxy Quest predicted the growth and influence of media fandom in the years after its release. While fandoms such as that for Star Trek existed at the time of the film, the size and scope presented by the fan conventions in the film had not been seen as much in 1999; since then, major fan conventions such as the San Diego Comic Con have become significant events that draw mainstream attention. The film also depicted fandoms using their numbers to influence production companies to revive cancelled works, such as with The Expanse, Veronica Mars, Arrested Development, and Twin Peaks. The film also captured some negative elements of modern fandom, such as leading actors continuously pestered by fans for intricate details of the work's fiction and other elements of the potentially toxic culture of online fan groups.

The novella Rabbit Remembered (2000) by John Updike mentions the character of Laliari from the film.

 Reaction from Star Trek actors 
Several actors who have had roles on various Star Trek television series and films have commented on Galaxy Quest in light of their own experiences with the franchise and its fandom.

Related media
Home video
The film was released by DreamWorks Home Entertainment on VHS and DVD on May 2, 2000. The DVD version included a 10-minute behind-the-scenes feature, cast and crew biographies and interviews, and deleted scenes. A special 10th anniversary deluxe edition was released on both DVD and Blu-ray by Paramount Home Entertainment on May 12, 2009; though they lacked the same features on the original DVD release, they included several new featurettes on the film's history, the cast, and the special effects used in the film's making, alongside the deleted scenes. For the film's 20th anniversary, a "Never Give Up, Never Surrender Edition" Blu-ray was released on November 5, 2019, featuring the same features as the 10th edition; a special SteelBook Best Buy exclusive was released on September 17, 2019.

 Tie-in media 
In November 1999, Galaxy Quest was novelized by science fiction writer Terry Bisson, who stayed very close to the plot of the film.

In 2008, IDW Publishing released a comic book sequel to the movie entitled Galaxy Quest: Global Warning. In January 2015, IDW launched an ongoing series set several years after the events of the film. In 2021, Eaglemoss Publications released a behind-the-scenes book entitled Galaxy Quest: The Inside Story.

 Proposed sequel or television series 
Talks of a sequel have been going on since the film's release in 1999, but only began gaining traction in 2014 when Allen mentioned that there was a script. Stars Weaver and Rockwell mentioned they were interested in returning. However, Colantoni has said he would prefer for there not to be a sequel, lest it tarnish the characters from the first film. He said, "to make something up, just because we love those characters, and turn it into a sequel—then it becomes the awful sequel".

In April 2015, Paramount Television, along with the movie's co-writer Gordon, director Parisot, and executive producers Johnson and Bernstein, announced they were looking to develop a television series based on Galaxy Quest. The move was considered in a similar vein as Paramount's revivals of Minority Report and School of Rock as television series. In August 2015, it was announced that Amazon Studios would be developing it.

In January 2016, after the unexpected death of Alan Rickman from pancreatic cancer, Tim Allen commented in The Hollywood Reporter about the franchise's chance of a revival:

Speaking to the Nerdist podcast in April 2016, Sam Rockwell revealed that the cast had been about ready to sign on for a follow up with Amazon, but Rickman's death, together with Allen's television schedule, had proved to be obstacles. He also said he believed Rickman's death meant the project would never happen.

However, the plans were revived in August 2017, with the announcement that Paul Scheer would be writing the series. Speaking to /Film, Scheer said that in his first drafts submitted to Amazon in November 2017 he wanted to create a serialized adventure that starts where the film ends, but leads into the cultural shift in Star Trek that has occurred since 1999; he said "I really wanted to capture the difference between the original cast of Star Trek and the J. J. Abrams cast of Star Trek." To that end, Scheer's initial scripts called for two separate cast sets that would come together by the end of the first season of the show, though he did not confirm if this included any of the original film's cast.

Following the dismissal of Amy Powell as president of Paramount Television in July 2018, Scheer said the Galaxy Quest series had been put on hold while Paramount's management was being re-established, but anticipated the show would continue forward after that. He also said they were making the series to allow the introduction of new characters while extending the setting, similar to what Star Wars: The Force Awakens did for A New Hope.

Allen stated that a film sequel script is nearly ready to go as of January 2021. The script had been near completion for production by 2016 but with Rickman's death, it would have to undergo major rewrites as the core story focused on the relationship between Nesmith and Dane (Allen and Rickman's characters, respectively). A central plot element was to have the Protector and its crew affected by time dilation during space flight, which Allen considered a boon for the uncertain production of the film. While Allen said there were no immediate efforts for the sequel's production, he and the other cast and crew keep circulating the idea and believe it would be easy to restart the effort.

Georgia Pritchett stated in a June 2021 interview that she and Simon Pegg were working on developing a Galaxy Quest television series.

 Documentary Never Surrender: A Galaxy Quest Documentary was produced by the web site Fandom in 2019 to celebrate the film's 20th anniversary. Titled after Captain Taggart's catchphrase "Never give up, never surrender!", it features interviews with the movie's cast and crew, including Allen, Weaver, Rockwell, Shalhoub, Long, Pyle, Wilson, and Mitchell, along with director Parisot and writer Gordon, as well as celebrities including Wil Wheaton, Brent Spiner, Greg Berlanti, Paul Scheer, and Damon Lindelof, who have spoken of their love for the film. Initially premiering to a limited audience at the October 2019 New York Comic Con, it subsequently had a limited theatrical showing at about 600 screens through Fathom Events on November 26, 2019, which included a screening of deleted scenes as well as the debut of Screen Junkies' "Honest Trailer" for Galaxy Quest. The film was made available on various digital media services for purchase in December 2019.

 See also 
 Fanboys – a comedy about Star Wars fans
 Free Enterprise – a comedy about Star Trek fans
 Trekkies – a documentary film about Star Trek fans
 The Orville - a comedy-drama series that parodies Star Trek'' in a similar manner

References

External links 

 
 
 
 
 
 
 
 

1999 films
1999 comedy films
1990s adventure films
1990s parody films
1990s science fiction comedy films
American adventure comedy films
American science fiction comedy films
American space adventure films
American parody films
DreamWorks Pictures films
Fictional-language films
Films adapted into comics
Films about extraterrestrial life
Self-reflexive films
Films about actors
Films about fandom
Films about television
Films directed by Dean Parisot
Films scored by David Newman
Films set in Los Angeles
Films set on fictional planets
Films set on spacecraft
Films shot in Los Angeles
Films shot in Utah
Films with screenplays by Robert Gordon
Hugo Award for Best Dramatic Presentation winning works
Nebula Award for Best Script-winning works
Parody films based on Star Trek
1990s English-language films
1990s American films